The men's 100 metres event at the 2015 Summer Universiade was held on 8 and 9 July at the Gwangju Universiade Main Stadium.

Senegal's quarterfinalist Daouda Diagne was disqualified and banned for four years after giving a positive doping test at the competition.

Medalists

Results

Heats
Qualification: First 3 in each heat (Q) and next 5 fastest (q) qualified for the quarterfinals.

Wind:Heat 1: +0.8 m/s, Heat 2: +1.7 m/s, Heat 3: -0.4 m/s, Heat 4: +1.0 m/s, Heat 5: +1.2 m/s, Heat 6: +0.6 m/s, Heat 7: +0.8 m/s, Heat 8: +1.3 m/s, Heat 9: +0.6 m/s

Quarterfinals
Qualification: First 3 in each heat (Q) and the next 4 fastest (q) qualified for the semifinals.

Wind:Heat 1: -0.8 m/s, Heat 2: -1.5 m/s, Heat 3: -1.1 m/s, Heat 4: -1.1 m/s

Semifinals
Qualification: First 4 in each heat (Q) qualified for the final.

Wind:Heat 1: +1.8 m/s, Heat 2: +0.3 m/s

Final
Wind: 0.0 m/s

References

100
2015